"Fiddlin' Man" is a song written and recorded by American country music artist Michael Martin Murphey. It was released in August 1986 as the third single from the album Tonight We Ride. The song reached No. 40 on the Billboard Hot Country Singles & Tracks chart.

Chart performance

References

1986 singles
1986 songs
Michael Martin Murphey songs
Songs written by Michael Martin Murphey
Song recordings produced by Jim Ed Norman
Warner Records singles